Sokwakhana Zazini (born 23 January 2000) is a South African athlete specialising in the 400 metres hurdles. He won Gold medals at the 2017 World U18 Championships and the 2018 World U20 Championships. In 2019, he won a silver medal at the Universiade.

He competed in the men's 400 metres hurdles at the 2020 Summer Olympics.

International competitions

Personal bests
Outdoor
400 metres – 45.86 (Paarl 2018)
400 metres hurdles – 48.73 (Napoli 2019)

References

External links

2000 births
Living people
South African male sprinters
South African male hurdlers
Universiade medalists in athletics (track and field)
Universiade silver medalists for South Africa
Athletes (track and field) at the 2019 African Games
World Athletics U20 Championships winners
Medalists at the 2019 Summer Universiade
World Youth Championships in Athletics winners
African Games competitors for South Africa
Athletes (track and field) at the 2020 Summer Olympics
Olympic athletes of South Africa
African Championships in Athletics winners
21st-century South African people